A longtang (Shanghainese: , Wugniu: lon⁶-daon⁶

A large variety of housing styles are called "lilong residences" in Shanghai. Of these, the best known and most characteristic is the shikumen, two- or three-storey terrace houses with a wall and large gate in front of each dwelling. Other types include the more modern "new style lilong"; the simplified "Cantonese style lilong"; the high-end villa-like "garden lilong"; and the higher density "apartment lilong". Colloquially, they are referred to as "lilong houses" or, as an English translation, "lane houses".

Governance

In the mid-20th century, after the establishment of Communist rule in Shanghai, a system of "neighbourhood committees" were set up as the lowest level of self-governing administrative organs in urban areas. Lilong committees acted as liaison between residents and the next level of administrative government (the sub-district), but also had various administrative powers in relation to public security and internal security, education, social welfare, employment, industry, health and mediation. In 1963, the Communist Party's Shanghai committee held a conference on the work of sub-districts, and the Shanghai People's Committee (the municipal government at the time) issued the Regulations for the Work of Lilong Committees in the Shanghai Municipality, which emphasizes that sub-districts and lilongs are "the frontier posts for class struggle, the home front of production, places of living, and important battle positions for the struggle to foster the proletariat and destroy the bourgeoisie".

Even today, neighbourhood committees are sometimes colloquially called "lilong committees".

Use of "-long" in addresses

"Long" is not only used to indicate the addresses of older lilong residential developments: Socialist style block housing developments from the 1950s to 1980s, and modern apartment complexes in Shanghai, are also given a long number as part of their addresses. The address format is typically as seen in an address like "Room 205, No.4, Lane 20, Jing'an Road, Shanghai" (a fictional address), or "Room 205, No. 4, Long 20, Jing'an Road, Shanghai".

Traditional lilong-style longdangs were typically given names by their developers: these typically ended in long, li, fang or cun, or, very rarely, hutong, a Mongol word. The names of some longdangs are associated with past business associations, for example Jiangyuan Long (Alley of the Sauce and Pickle Shop), although it is far more common to use the name of the developer, the name of the adjoining main road, or some other auspicious name. Although such names are still in common use, they are not part of the official street addresses, which would instead use a long number.

Chinese character for "long"
In simplified Chinese confusion is sometimes caused between lòng ("alley"; traditional Chinese  or ) with the verb nòng ("tamper with"; traditional Chinese ) since both have been simplified down to "" by removal of the radical (a hand-radical shǒu-bù  in the case of "tamper with", a walk-radical compounded from chì  "step" and chù  "step" on both sides of the phonetic  "public" in the case of "alley"). In simplified Chinese the two characters are now written the same way, but the two different pronunciations are still retained in standard Mandarin, where only context indicates whether to read lòng or nòng. However, in Shanghainese the verb is also pronounced  (lon).

As to the traditional Chinese character for "long", the form  has been in use since at least the end of the 19th century, but even 19th century scholars posited that the "correct" written form of "long" should be .

See also

 Shikumen

References

Culture in Shanghai
Longtang